Fountains of Wayne is the debut studio album by the American rock band Fountains of Wayne. It was released on TAG Recordings, Scratchie Records, and Atlantic Records in 1996.

Background
College friends Chris Collingwood and Adam Schlesinger had formed two failing bands before reconvening in Manhattan, where Collingwood wrote future Fountains of Wayne songs "Joe Rey", "Leave the Biker" and "Radiation Vibe" in a half a day, then met with Schlesinger over drinks in order to start another band. According to Collingwood, "Basically, we started all this by writing a bunch of titles on bar napkins and trying to get the other guy to laugh. We'd get drunk and just sit there writing and laughing. We wound up with a list of hundreds of titles. Then we'd decide between the two of us who was going to take which song, and then meet the next night and see what we'd come up with." Eventually it took a week to write the songs that were included on their debut album.

Recording
Fountains of Wayne was recorded when the band was just a duo, before the recruitment of drummer Brian Young and guitarist Jody Porter to the band. (Young and Porter are listed as bandmembers on later reissues of the record, but not on the original release.) Collingwood and Schlesinger provide all the instrumentation on the recording, except for the bass guitar parts, which were performed by guest bassist Danny Weinkauf, ex-The Belltower. Schlesinger and Porter had also been members of The Belltower, and Weinkauf later played with Lincoln before joining They Might Be Giants. Dominique Durand of the band Ivy, of which Schlesinger was also a member, provided backing vocals on "Survival Car".

In 2016, Schlesinger explained the recording process: "On the recording, I was playing drums, Danny was playing bass and Chris was playing guitar. Then Chris and I would take turns doing some overdubs on guitar or a little keys. After we made the record, Danny decided to do other stuff (he’s now been touring and recording with They Might Be Giants for many years), and that’s when we found Jody and Brian and switched the line-up around, and I started playing bass."

The album's recording took a week and cost 5,000 dollars, with more money spent on mixing. According to Collingwood, "It was deliberate that we were going to write the album and record it quickly, before we had time to think about anything. Prior to this, Adam and I had both been careful, serious songwriters, in the vein of Simon & Garfunkel. We were much more careful about the arrangements and everything. But when we decided to make this record quickly and spontaneously, we figured that since doing it so fast was such a stupid idea, the band needed a stupid name as well."

Cover
The album's cover photo of a little boy clutching a rabbit and posing like a superhero was shot by Nick Waplington. It was also used for the album cover of Plastic Jewels by the UK band Flamingoes, which came out in the US two weeks before this album. According to Chris Collingwood, "This English photographer licensed the photograph to both bands. Worse than that, he was directly asked by us if he had licensed it to anybody else and he said no. So, basically, the guy's a complete asshole. We're changing the cover in Europe, but we're keeping it the same in the States. It's just too good a picture."

Release

The album was met with moderate commercial success and favorable reviews. Songs from it were featured on MTV's 120 Minutes program. The album's lead single "Radiation Vibe" was included in the 2021 edition of Rolling Stone's 500 Greatest Songs of All Time.

A reissue of the vinyl was released on Yep Roc Records.

Track listing

Personnel
Chris Collingwood – vocals, guitar, keyboards
Adam Schlesinger – vocals, guitar, keyboards, drums, production, mixing on "Sink to the Bottom"
Danny Weinkauf – bass guitar
Dominique Durand – backing vocals on "Survival Car"
Gary Maurer – engineer, mixing on "Sink to the Bottom"
Greg Calbi – mastering
Chris Shaw – mixing on all tracks except "Sink to the Bottom"
Eric Tew – assistant mixing

References

External links

Fountains of Wayne at YouTube (streamed copy where licensed)

Fountains of Wayne albums
1996 debut albums
Atlantic Records albums
Albums produced by Adam Schlesinger